White Famous is an American sitcom starring Jay Pharoah, based on the life of Jamie Foxx, which aired on Showtime from October 15, 2017 until December 10, 2017.

It is co-created by Tom Kapinos, Chris Spencer and Buddy Lewis, directed by Tim Story and Foxx, who will also be a recurring guest star.

On December 29, 2017, the series was canceled after one season.

Premise
White Famous follows a talented, young African-American comedian, Floyd Mooney, whose star is rising, forcing him to navigate the treacherous waters of maintaining his credibility as he begins to cross-over toward becoming “'white famous.'”

The series is set in the same universe as Kapinos's previous show, Californication, and features some secondary characters from that series.

Cast and characters
Jay Pharoah as Floyd Mooney
Utkarsh Ambudkar as Malcolm
Cleopatra Coleman as Sadie Lewis
Jacob Ming-Trent as Ron Balls
Lonnie Chavis as Trevor Mooney
Meagan Good as Kali
Stephen Tobolowsky as Stu Beggs
Natalie Zea as Amy Von Getz
Michael Rapaport as Teddy Snow
Jack Davenport as Peter King
Lyndon Smith as Gwen
Jamie Foxx as himself

Episodes

Reception
The first season of White Famous was met with a mixed to negative response from critics. On the review aggregation website Rotten Tomatoes, as of January 2018, the first season held a 58% approval rating with an average rating of 5.64 out of 10 based on 26 reviews. Metacritic, which uses a weighted average, assigned the season a score of 54 out of 100 based on 20 reviews, indicating "mixed or average reviews".

References

External links

2010s American black sitcoms
2010s American single-camera sitcoms
2017 American television series debuts
2017 American television series endings
Showtime (TV network) original programming
English-language television shows
Television shows set in Los Angeles
Television series by Lionsgate Television